The 2016–17 Milwaukee Bucks season was the 49th season of the franchise in the National Basketball Association (NBA). For the first time since 2010, the Bucks had a winning record in the regular season finished at 42–40.

The Bucks finished the regular season with a 42–40 record, securing the 6th seed. In the playoffs, they faced off against the 3rd seeded Toronto Raptors, where they lost in six games. It was also be the last season with John Hammond as general manager. He would leave his spot to become the general manager of the Orlando Magic on May 23, 2017 and later he was replaced by Jon Horst.

Draft picks

Roster

Preseason

Game log

|- style="background:#cfc;"
| 1
| October 3
| @ Bulls
| 
| Greg Monroe (15)
| Michael Carter-Williams (11)
| Matthew Dellavedova (6)
| United Center20,104
| 1–0
|- style="background:#cfc;"
| 2
| October 8
| Mavericks
| 
| Jabari Parker (21)
| Michael Beasley (9)
| Malcolm Brogdon (6)
| Kohl Center10,560
| 2–0
|- style="background:#fcc;"
| 3
| October 12
| @ Pacers
| 
| Giannis Antetokounmpo (20)
| John Henson (8)
| Giannis Antetokounmpo (6)
| Bankers Life Fieldhouse6,447
| 2–1
|- style="background:#fcc;"
| 4
| October 15
| Bulls
| 
| Jabari Parker (21)
| Antetokounmpo, Beasley, Parker (6)
| Matthew Dellavedova (8)
| BMO Harris Bradley Center10,794
| 2–2
|- style="background:#fcc;"
| 5
| October 17
| @ Pistons
| 
| Giannis Antetokounmpo (21)
| Greg Monroe (8)
| Antetokounmpo, Dellavedova (4)
| The Palace of Auburn Hills10,096
| 2–3
|- style="background:#cfc;"
| 6
| October 19
| Pacers
| 
| Giannis Antetokounmpo (20)
| Jabari Parker (10)
| Matthew Dellavedova (7)
| BMO Harris Bradley Center5,450
| 3–3

Standings

Division

Conference
 quandle dingle

Game log

Regular season

|- style="background:#fcc"
| 1
| October 26
| Charlotte
| 
| Giannis Antetokounmpo (31)
| Greg Monroe (10)
| Giannis Antetokounmpo (5)
| BMO Harris Bradley Center18,717
| 0–1
|- style="background:#cfc"
| 2
| October 29
| Brooklyn
| 
| Rashad Vaughn (22)
| John Henson (12)
| Matthew Dellavedova (9)
| BMO Harris Bradley Center12,570
| 1–1
|- style="background:#fcc"
| 3
| October 30
| @ Detroit
| 
| Giannis Antetokounmpo (17)
| Giannis Antetokounmpo (8)
| Giannis Antetokounmpo (8)
| The Palace of Auburn Hills15,161
| 1–2

|- style="background:#cfc"
| 4
| November 1
| @ New Orleans
| 
| Giannis Antetokounmpo (24)
| Antetokounmpo, Snell (10)
| Giannis Antetokounmpo (7)
| Smoothie King Center18,217
| 2–2
|- style="background:#cfc"
| 5
| November 3
| Indiana
| 
| Antetokounmpo, Parker (22)
| Greg Monroe (16)
| Giannis Antetokounmpo (9)
| BMO Harris Bradley Center11,374
| 3–2
|- style="background:#cfc"
| 6
| November 5
| Sacramento
| 
| Mirza Teletovic (22)
| Giannis Antetokounmpo (8)
| Giannis Antetokounmpo (8)
| BMO Harris Bradley Center16,021
| 4–2
|- style="background:#fcc"
| 7
| November 6
| @ Dallas
| 
| Jabari Parker (16)
| Greg Monroe (12)
| Matthew Dellavedova (6)
| American Airlines Center19,345
| 4–3
|- style="background:#fcc"
| 8
| November 10
| New Orleans
| 
| Jabari Parker (33)
| Giannis Antetokounmpo (9)
| Matthew Dellavedova (12)
| BMO Harris Bradley Center12,159
| 4−4
|- style="background:#cfc"
| 9
| November 12
| Memphis
| 
| Giannis Antetokounmpo (27)
| Monroe, Henson (7)
| Giannis Antetokounmpo (5)
| BMO Harris Bradley Center14,327
| 5−4
|- style="background:#fcc;"
| 10
| November 16
| @ Atlanta
| 
| Giannis Antetokounmpo (26)
| Giannis Antetokounmpo (15)
| Antetokounmpo, Dellavedova (7)
| Philips Arena14,656
| 5–5
|- style="background:#fcc"
| 11
| November 17
| @ Miami
| 
| Antetokounmpo, Snell (14)
| Michael Beasley (10)
| Matthew Dellavedova (9)
| American Airlines Arena19,600
| 5–6
|- style="background:#fcc"
| 12
| November 19
| Golden State
| 
| Giannis Antetokounmpo (30)
| Snell, Henson (7)
| Giannis Antetokounmpo (6)
| BMO Harris Bradley Center14,327
| 5−7
|- style="background:#cfc;"
| 13
| November 21
| Orlando
| 
| Giannis Antetokounmpo (25)
| Giannis Antetokounmpo (10)
| Giannis Antetokounmpo (10)
| BMO Harris Bradley Center12,306
| 6–7
|- style="background:#fcc;"
| 14
| November 25
| Toronto
| 
| Giannis Antetokounmpo (29)
| Greg Monroe (11)
| Giannis Antetokounmpo (11)
| BMO Harris Bradley Center16,223
| 6–8
|- style="background:#cfc;"
| 15
| November 27
| @ Orlando
| 
| John Henson (20)
| Giannis Antetokounmpo (9)
| Matthew Dellavedova (8)
| Amway Center16,521
| 7–8
|- style="background:#cfc;"
| 16
| November 29
| Cleveland
| 
| Giannis Antetokounmpo (34)
| Giannis Antetokounmpo (12)
| Matthew Dellavedova (8)
| BMO Harris Bradley Center 16,559
| 8–8

|- style="background:#cfc"
| 17
| December 1
| @ Brooklyn
| 
| Giannis Antetokounmpo (23)
| Antetokounmpo, Henson (8)
| Giannis Antetokounmpo (8)
| Barclays Center12,675
| 9–8
|- style="background:#cfc"
| 18
| December 3
| Brooklyn
| 
| John Henson (20)
| Giannis Antetokounmpo (10)
| Antetokounmpo, Dellavedova (6)
| BMO Harris Bradley Center15,565
| 10–8
|- style="background:#fcc"
| 19
| December 5
| San Antonio
| 
| Jabari Parker (23)
| Greg Monroe (13)
| Malcolm Brogdon (5)
| BMO Harris Bradley Center14,256
| 10–9
|- style="background:#cfc;"
| 20
| December 7
| Portland
| 
| Jabari Parker (27)
| Giannis Antetokounmpo (12)
| Giannis Antetokounmpo (11)
| BMO Harris Bradley Center14,033
| 11–9
|- style="background:#fcc;"
| 21
| December 9
| Atlanta
| 
| Jabari Parker (27)
| Antetokounmpo, Henson, Monroe, Beasley (6)
| Greg Monroe (5)
| BMO Harris Bradley Center16,289
| 11–10
|- style="background:#fcc;"
| 22
| December 10
| @ Washington
| 
| Giannis Antetokounmpo (28)
| Giannis Antetokounmpo (13)
| Giannis Antetokounmpo (7)
| Verizon Center14,816
| 11–11
|- style="background:#fcc;"
| 23
| December 12
| @ Toronto
| 
| Giannis Antetokounmpo (30)
| Antetokounmpo, Teletovic (8)
| Matthew Dellavedova (10)
| Air Canada Centre19,800
| 11–12
|- style="background:#cfc"
| 24
| December 15
| Chicago
| 
| Giannis Antetokounmpo (30)
| Giannis Antetokounmpo (14)
| Matthew Dellavedova (9)
| Bradley Center16,704
| 12–12
|- style="background:#cfc"
| 25
| December 16
| @ Chicago
| 
| Giannis Antetokounmpo (22)
| Greg Monroe (12)
| Giannis Antetokounmpo (11)
| United Center21,324
| 13–12
|- style= "background:#fcc"
| 26
| December 20
| Cleveland
| 
| Jabari Parker (30)
| Giannis Antetokounmpo (13)
| Brogdon, Dellavedova (5)
| BMO Harris Bradley Center 17,053
| 13–13
|- style= "background:#fcc;"
| 27
| December 21
| @ Cleveland
| 
| Giannis Antetokounmpo (28)
| John Henson (8)
| Malcolm Brogdon (7)
| Quicken Loans Arena 20,562
| 13–14
|- style="background:#cfc;"
| 28
| December 23
| Washington
| 
| Giannis Antetokounmpo (39)
| Greg Monroe (11)
| Malcolm Brogdon (7)
| BMO Harris Bradley Center15,921
| 14–14
|- style="background:#fcc;"
| 29
| December 26
| @ Washington
| 
| Giannis Antetokounmpo (22)
| Giannis Antetokounmpo (12)
| Matthew Dellavedova (11)
| Verizon Center15,773
| 14–15
|-style="background:#cfc;"
| 30
| December 28
| @ Detroit
| 
| Jabari Parker (31)
| Jabari Parker (9)
| Brogdon, Antetokounmpo (8)
| Palace of Auburn Hills17,222
| 15–15
|- style="background:#fcc;"
| 31
| December 30
| @ Minnesota
| 
| Giannis Antetokounmpo (25)
| Giannis Antetokounmpo (7)
| Giannis Antetokounmpo (5)
| Target Center17,779
| 15–16
|- style="background:#cfc;"
| 32
| December 31
| @ Chicago
| 
| Giannis Antetokounmpo (35)
| Malcolm Brogdon (11)
| Malcolm Brogdon (12)
| United Center21,838
| 16–16

|- style="background:#cfc;"
| 33
| January 2
| Oklahoma City
| 
| Giannis Antetokounmpo (26)
| Giannis Antetokounmpo (10)
| Antetokounmpo, Brogdon (5)
| BMO Harris Bradley Center17,423
| 17–16
|- style="background:#cfc;"
| 34
| January 4
| @ New York
| 
| Giannis Antetokounmpo (27)
| Giannis Antetokounmpo (13)
| Malcolm Brogdon (8)
| Madison Square Garden19,812
| 18–16
|- style="background:#fcc;"
| 35
| January 6
| New York
| 
| Antetokounmpo, Parker (25)
| Greg Monroe (7)
| Antetokounmpo, Brogdon, Terry (5)
| BMO Harris Bradley Center18,717
| 18–17
|- style="background:#fcc;"
| 36
| January 8
| Washington
| 
| Jabari Parker (28)
| Greg Monroe (12)
| Jabari Parker (7)
| BMO Harris Bradley Center15,311
| 18–18
|-style="background:#cfc;"
| 37
| January 10
| @ San Antonio
| 
| Michael Beasley (28)
| Greg Monroe (9)
| Malcolm Brogdon (6)
| AT&T Center18,418
| 19–18
|- style="background:#cfc;"
| 38
| January 13
| Miami
| 
| Jabari Parker (24)
| Greg Monroe (11)
| Matthew Dellavedova (11)
| BMO Harris Bradley Center17,483
| 20–18
|- style="background:#fcc;"
| 39
| January 15
| @ Atlanta
| 
| Giannis Antetokounmpo (33)
| Jabari Parker (10)
| Jabari Parker (9)
| Philips Arena14,231
| 20–19
|- style="background:#fcc;"
| 40
| January 16
| Philadelphia
| 
| Antetokounmpo, Parker (23)
| Antetokounmpo, Beasley, Monroe (6)
| Malcolm Brogdon (6)
| BMO Harris Bradley Center 13,261
| 20–20
|- style="background:#fcc;"
| 41
| January 18
| @ Houston
| 
| Giannis Antetokounmpo (32)
| Giannis Antetokounmpo (11)
| Malcolm Brogdon (8)
| Toyota Center15,782
| 20–21
|- style="background:#fcc;"
| 42
| January 20
| @ Orlando
| 
| Jabari Parker (25)
| Giannis Antetokounmpo (14)
| Jabari Parker (6)
| Amway Center19,307
| 20–22
|- style="background:#fcc;"
| 43
| January 21
| @ Miami
| 
| Giannis Antetokounmpo (24)
| Giannis Antetokounmpo (10)
| Matthew Dellavedova (7)
| American Airlines Arena19,600
| 20–23
|- style="background:#cfc;"
| 44
| January 23
| Houston
| 
| Giannis Antetokounmpo (31)
| Greg Monroe (10)
| Dellavedova, Parker (7)
| BMO Harris Bradley Center14,016
| 21–23
|- style="background:#fcc;"
| 45
| January 25
| Philadelphia
| 
| Greg Monroe (28)
| Giannis Antetokounmpo (12)
| Malcolm Brogdon (7)
| Bradley Center13,663
| 21–24
|- style="background:#fcc;"
| 46
| January 27
| @ Toronto
| 
| Jabari Parker (21)
| Jabari Parker (13)
| Giannis Antetokounmpo (8)
| Air Canada Centre19,800
| 21–25
|- style="background:#fcc;"
| 47
| January 28
| Boston
| 
| Giannis Antetokounmpo (21)
| Greg Monroe (13)
| Antetokounmpo, Dellavedova (6)
| Bradley Center18,717
| 21–26

|- style="background:#fcc;"
| 48
| February 1
| @ Utah
| 
| Jabari Parker (17)
| Tony Snell (7)
| Snell, Parker (7)
| Vivint Smart Home Arena19,694
| 21–27
|- style="background:#fcc;"
| 49
| February 3
| @ Denver
| 
| Jabari Parker (27)
| Jabari Parker (11)
| Matthew Dellavedova (12)
| Pepsi Center18,792
| 21–28
|- style="background:#cfc;"
| 50
| February 4
| @ Phoenix
| 
| Giannis Antetokounmpo (30)
| Giannis Antetokounmpo (12)
| Malcolm Brogdon (8)
| Talking Stick Resort Arena17,192
| 22–28
|- style="background:#fcc;"
| 51
| February 8
| Miami
| 
| Giannis Antetokounmpo (22)
| Giannis Antetokounmpo (8)
| Malcolm Brogdon (6)
| Bradley Center14,211
| 22–29
|- style="background:#fcc;"
| 52
| February 10
| L. A. Lakers
| 
| Giannis Antetokounmpo (41)
| Giannis Antetokounmpo (8)
| Middleton, Antetokounmpo (6)
| Bradley Center16,380
| 22–30
|- style= "background:#cfc;"
| 53
| February 11
| @ Indiana
| 
| Giannis Antetokounmpo (20)
| Monroe, Antetokounmpo (8)
| Giannis Antetokounmpo (10)
| Bankers Life Fieldhouse17,923
| 23–30
|- style="background:#cfc;"
| 54
| February 13
| Detroit
| 
| Greg Monroe (25)
| Greg Monroe (13)
| Giannis Antetokounmpo (6)
| Bradley Center13.397
| 24–30
|- style="background:#cfc;"
| 55
| February 15
| @ Brooklyn
| 
| Giannis Antetokounmpo (33)
| Giannis Antetokounmpo (9)
| Khris Middleton (7)
| Barclays Center16,182
| 25–30
|- style="background:#fcc;"
| 56
| February 24
| Utah
| 
| Giannis Antetokounmpo (33)
| Giannis Antetokounmpo (12)
| Matthew Dellavedova (6)
| Bradley Center16,064
| 25–31
|- style="background:#cfc;"
| 57
| February 26
| Phoenix
| 
| Giannis Antetokounmpo (28)
| Antetokounmpo, Monroe (8)
| Malcolm Brogdon (7)
| BMO Harris Bradley Center16,051
| 26–31
|- style= "background:#fcc;"
| 58
| February 27
| @ Cleveland
| 
| Malcolm Brogdon (20)
| Giannis Antetokounmpo (7)
| Giannis Antetokounmpo (8)
| Quicken Loans Arena 20,562
| 26–32

|- style= "background:#fcc;"
| 59
| March 1
| Denver
| 
| Khris Middleton (21)
| Antetokounmpo, Monroe (9)
| Khris Middleton (5)
| BMO Harris Bradley Center13,214
| 26–33
|- style= "background:#cfc;"
| 60
| March 3
| L. A. Clippers
| 
| Giannis Antetokounmpo (24)
| Antetokounmpo, Monroe (5)
| Khris Middleton (9)
| BMO Harris Bradley Center16,208
| 27–33
|- style="background:#cfc;"
| 61
| March 4
| Toronto
| 
| Khris Middleton (24)
| Giannis Antetokounmpo (10)
| Giannis Antetokounmpo (4)
| BMO Harris Bradley Center16,775
| 28–33
|- style="background:#cfc;"
| 62
| March 6
| @ Philadelphia
|
| Giannis Antetokounmpo (24)
| Giannis Antetokounmpo (8)
| Khris Middleton (8)
| Wells Fargo Center18,351
| 29–33
|- style="background:#cfc;"
| 63
| March 8
| New York
| 
| Giannis Antetokounmpo (32)
| Giannis Antetokounmpo (13)
| Giannis Antetokounmpo (7)
| Bradley Center13,767
| 30–33
|- style="background:#cfc;"
| 64
| March 10
| Indiana
| 
| Antetokounmpo, Middleton (21)
| Giannis Antetokounmpo (8)
| Giannis Antetokounmpo (5)
| Bradley Center16,177
| 31–33
|- style="background:#cfc;"
| 65
| March 11
| Minnesota
| 
| Tony Snell (19)
| Khris Middleton (8)
| Giannis Antetokounmpo (7)
| Bradley Center18,717
| 32–33
|- style="background:#fcc;"
| 66
| March 13
| @ Memphis
| 
| Giannis Antetokounmpo (18)
| Antetokounmpo, Henson, Monroe (5)
| Giannis Antetokounmpo (4)
| FedExForum16,770
| 32–34
|- style="background:#cfc;"
| 67
| March 15
| @ L. A. Clippers
| 
| Antetokounmpo, Middleton (16)
| Henson, Middleton (7)
| Antetokounmpo, Middleton (5)
| Staples Center19,060
| 33–34
|- style="background:#cfc;"
| 68
| March 17
| @ L. A. Lakers
| 
| Giannis Antetokounmpo (26)
| John Henson (9)
| Antetokounmpo, Dellavedova (5)
| Staples Center18,997
| 34–34
|- style="background:#fcc;"
| 69
| March 18
| @ Golden State
| 
| Malcolm Brogdon (18)
| Greg Monroe (7)
| Khris Middleton (5)
| Oracle Arena19,596
| 34–35
|- style="background:#cfc;"
| 70
| March 21
| @ Portland
| 
| Khris Middleton (26)
| Greg Monroe (9)
| Malcolm Brogdon (4)
| Moda Center19,525
| 35–35
|- style="background:#cfc;"
| 71
| March 22
| @ Sacramento
| 
| Giannis Antetokounmpo (32)
| Giannis Antetokounmpo (13)
| Giannis Antetokounmpo (6)
| Golden 1 Center17,608
| 36–35
|- style="background:#cfc;"
| 72
| March 24
| Atlanta
| 
| Giannis Antetokounmpo (34)
| Giannis Antetokounmpo (13)
| Malcolm Brogdon (7)
| Bradley Center16,786
| 37–35
|- style="background:#fcc;"
| 73
| March 26
| Chicago
| 
| Giannis Antetokounmpo (22)
| Giannis Antetokounmpo (8)
| Antetokounmpo, Brogdon, Dellavedova (4)
| Bradley Center17,669
| 37–36
|-style="background:#cfc;"
| 74
| March 28
| @ Charlotte
| 
| Tony Snell (26)
| Antetokounmpo, Monroe (8)
| Malcolm Brogdon (10)
| Spectrum Center16,505
| 38–36
|- style="background:#cfc;"
| 75
| March 29
| @ Boston
| 
| Giannis Antetokounmpo (22)
| Giannis Antetokounmpo (9)
| Malcolm Brogdon (9)
| TD Garden18,624
| 39–36
|- style="background:#cfc;"
| 76
| March 31
| Detroit
| 
| Giannis Antetokounmpo (28)
| Giannis Antetokounmpo (13)
| Giannis Antetokounmpo (9)
| Bradley Center18,717
| 40–36

|- style="background:#fcc;"
| 77
| April 2
| Dallas
| 
| Giannis Antetokounmpo (31)
| Giannis Antetokounmpo (15)
| Giannis Antetokounmpo (9)
| Bradley Center18,717
| 40–37
|- style="background:#fcc;"
| 78
| April 4
| @ Oklahoma City
| 
| Michael Beasley (14)
| Giannis Antetokounmpo (10)
| Giannis Antetokounmpo (4)
| Chesapeake Energy Arena18,203
| 40–38
|- style=background:#fcc;"
| 79
| April 6
| @ Indiana
| 
| Giannis Antetokounmpo (25)
| Giannis Antetokounmpo (7)
| Giannis Antetokounmpo (6)
| Bankers Life Fieldhouse17,010
| 40–39
|- style="background:#cfc;"
| 80
| April 8
| @ Philadelphia
| 
| Giannis Antetokounmpo (20)
| Giannis Antetokounmpo (10)
| Giannis Antetokounmpo (6)
| Wells Fargo Center16,301
| 41–39
|- style="background:#cfc;"
| 81
| April 10
| Charlotte
| 
| Greg Monroe (16)
| Giannis Antetokounmpo (11)
| Giannis Antetokounmpo (10)
| Bradley Center18,717
| 42–39
|- style="background:#fcc;"
| 82
| April 12
| @ Boston
| 
| Beasley, Hawes (15)
| Gary Payton II (7)
| Gary Payton II (5)
| Bradley Center18,624
| 42–40

Playoffs

|- style="background:#cfc;"
| 1
| April 15
| @ Toronto
| 
| Giannis Antetokounmpo (28)
| Greg Monroe (15)
| Khris Middleton (9)
| Air Canada Centre19,800
| 1–0
|- style="background:#fcc;"
| 2
| April 18
| @ Toronto
| 
| Giannis Antetokounmpo (24)
| Giannis Antetokounmpo (15)
| Giannis Antetokounmpo (7)
| Air Canada Centre20,077
| 1–1
|- style="background:#cfc;"
| 3
| April 20
| Toronto
| 
| Khris Middleton (20)
| Giannis Antetokounmpo (8)
| Malcolm Brogdon (9)
| Bradley Center18,717
| 2–1
|- style="background:#fcc;"
| 4
| April 22
| Toronto
| 
| Tony Snell (19)
| Khris Middleton (11)
| Giannis Antetokounmpo (4)
| Bradley Center18,717
| 2–2
|- style="background:#fcc;"
| 5
| April 24
| @ Toronto
| 
| Giannis Antetokounmpo (30)
| Giannis Antetokounmpo (9)
| Khris Middleton (6)
| Air Canada Centre20,251
| 2–3
|- style="background:#fcc;"
| 6
| April 27
| Toronto
| 
| Giannis Antetokounmpo (34)
| Giannis Antetokounmpo (9)
| Khris Middleton (5)
| Bradley Center18,717
| 2–4

Player statistics

Regular season

|- align="center" bgcolor="#f0f0f0
| 
| 80 || style="background:#274e37;color:#dfd3b0;" |80 || style="background:#274e37;color:#dfd3b0;" |35.6 || .521 || .272 || .770 || style="background:#274e37;color:#dfd3b0;" |8.8||style="background:#274e37;color:#dfd3b0;" |5.4 || style="background:#274e37;color:#dfd3b0;" |1.6 || style="background:#274e37;color:#dfd3b0;" |1.9 ||style="background:#274e37;color:#dfd3b0;" |22.9
|- align="center" bgcolor="#f0f0f0"
| 
| 56 || 6 || 16.7 || .532 || .419 || .743 || 3.4 || 0.9 || 0.5 || 0.5 || 9.4
|- align="center" bgcolor="#f0f0f0"
| 
| 75 || 28 || 26.4 || .457 || .404 || .865 || 2.8 || 4.2 || 1.1 || 0.2 || 10.2
|- align="center" bgcolor="#f0f0f0"
| 
| 76 || 54 || 26.1 || .390 || .367 || .854 || 1.9 || 4.7 || 0.7 || 0.0|| 7.6
|- align="center" bgcolor="#f0f0f0"
|  
| 19 || 0 || 9.0 || .508 || .346 || .778 || 2.4 || 1.0 || 0.1 || 0.2 || 4.4
|- align="center" bgcolor="#f0f0f0"
| 
| 58 || 39 || 19.4 || .515 || .000 || .692 || 5.1 || 1.0 || 0.5 || 1.3 || 6.8
|- align="center" bgcolor="#f0f0f0"
| 
| 57 || 34 || 9.9 || .459 || .378 || .653 || 2.0 || 0.4 || 0.2 || 0.5 || 4.0
|- align="center" bgcolor="#f0f0f0"
| 
| 29 || 23 || 30.7 || .450 || style="background:#274e37;color:#dfd3b0;" |.433 || style="background:#274e37;color:#dfd3b0;" |.880 || 4.2 || 3.4 || 1.4 || 0.2 || 14.7
|- align="center" bgcolor="#f0f0f0"
| 
|style="background:#274e37;color:#dfd3b0;" |81 || 0 || 22.5 || style="background:#274e37;color:#dfd3b0;" |.533 || .000 || .741 || 6.6 || 2.3 || 1.1 || 0.5 || 11.7
|- align="center" bgcolor="#f0f0f0"
|  
| 8 || 0 || 2.8 || .286 || .167 || N/A || 0.4 || 0.0 || 0.0 || 0.0 || 0.6
|- align="center" bgcolor="#f0f0f0"
| 
| 51 || 50 || 33.9 || .490 || .365 || .743 || 6.2 || 2.8 || 1.0 || 0.4 || 20.1
|- align="center" bgcolor="#f0f0f0"
|  
| 32 || 12 || 9.7 || .441 || N/A || .629 || 1.7 || 0.6 || 0.3 || 0.3 || 2.6
|- align="center" bgcolor="#f0f0f0"
| 
| 80 || style="background:#274e37;color:#dfd3b0;" |80|| 29.2 || .455 || .406 || .810 || 3.1 || 1.2 || 0.7 || 0.2 || 8.5
|- align="center" bgcolor="#f0f0f0"
| 
| 70 || 2 || 16.2 || .373 || .341 || .778 || 2.3 || 0.7 || 0.2 || 0.2 || 6.4
|- align="center" bgcolor="#f0f0f0"
| 
| 74 || 0 || 18.4 || .432 || .427 || .828 || 1.4 || 1.3 || 0.6 || 0.3 || 4.1
|- align="center" bgcolor="#f0f0f0"
| 
| 41 || 2 || 11.2 || .365 || .321 || .400 || 1.2 || 0.6 || 0.5 || 0.2 || 3.5
|}
  Statistics with the Milwaukee Bucks.

Playoffs

|- align="center" bgcolor="#f0f0f0"
| 
|style="background:#274e37;color:#dfd3b0;" |6 || style="background:#274e37;color:#dfd3b0;" |6 || style="background:#274e37;color:#dfd3b0;" |40.5 || style="background:#274e37;color:#dfd3b0;" |.536 || .400 || .543 || style="background:#274e37;color:#dfd3b0;" |9.5 || 4.0 || style="background:#274e37;color:#dfd3b0;" |2.2 || 1.7 ||style="background:#274e37;color:#dfd3b0;" |24.8
|- align="center" bgcolor="#f0f0f0"
| 
| 4 || 0 || 12.0 || .350 || .600 || .000 || 2.3 || 0.3 || 0.3 || 0.3 || 4.3
|- align="center" bgcolor="#f0f0f0"
| 
|style="background:#274e37;color:#dfd3b0;" |6 || style="background:#274e37;color:#dfd3b0;" |6 || 30.5 || .400 || .476 || N/A || 4.3 || 3.5 || 0.5 || 0.3 || 9.0
|- align="center" bgcolor="#f0f0f0"
| 
|style="background:#274e37;color:#dfd3b0;" |6 || 0 || 26.5 || .390 || .375 || .800 || 2.0 || 2.0 || 0.2 || 0.0 || 7.7
|- align="center" bgcolor="#f0f0f0"
| 
| 3 || 0 || 5.7 || .400 || .500 || N/A || 1.3 || 0.3 || 0.0 || 0.3 || 1.7
|- align="center" bgcolor="#f0f0f0"
| 
| 2 || 0 || 6.0 || .250 || N/A || style="background:#274e37;color:#dfd3b0;" |1.000 || 2.0 || 0.0 || 0.5 || 0.0 || 1.5
|- align="center" bgcolor="#f0f0f0"
| 
|style="background:#274e37;color:#dfd3b0;" |6|| style="background:#274e37;color:#dfd3b0;" |6 || 19.3 || .387 || .200 || .818 || 3.2 || 2.0 || 0.8 || style="background:#274e37;color:#dfd3b0;" |1.8 || 5.8
|- align="center" bgcolor="#f0f0f0"
| 
|style="background:#274e37;color:#dfd3b0;" |6 || style="background:#274e37;color:#dfd3b0;" |6 || 38.5 || .397 || .368 || .818 || 4.7 || style="background:#274e37;color:#dfd3b0;" |5.3 || 2.0 || 0.0 || 14.5
|- align="center" bgcolor="#f0f0f0"
| 
|style="background:#274e37;color:#dfd3b0;" |6 || 0 || 23.5 || .529 || N/A || .833 || 7.3 || 1.7 || 1.3 || 0.5 || 13.2
|- align="center" bgcolor="#f0f0f0"
| 
|style="background:#274e37;color:#dfd3b0;" |6 || style="background:#274e37;color:#dfd3b0;" |6 || 30.8 || .500 || .516 || N/A || 2.3 || 1.5 || 0.2 || 0.2 || 10.0
|- align="center" bgcolor="#f0f0f0"
| 
| 3 || 0 || 9.0 || .167 || .250 || N/A || 1.0 || 0.0 || 0.3 || 0.0 || 1.0
|- align="center" bgcolor="#f0f0f0"
| 
|style="background:#274e37;color:#dfd3b0;" |6 || 0 || 11.3 || .333 || .200 || style="background:#274e37;color:#dfd3b0;" |1.000 ||1.3  ||0.8 || 0.5 || 0.2 || 2.5
|- align="center" bgcolor="#f0f0f0"
| 
| 3 || 0 || 3.3|| .500||style="background:#274e37;color:#dfd3b0;" |1.000|| N/A || 0.0 || 0.0|| 0.0|| 0.0|| 2.0
|}

Transactions

Overview

Trades

Free agents

References

Milwaukee Bucks seasons
Milwaukee Bucks
Milwaukee Bucks
Milwaukee Bucks